Gymnoscelis pseudotibialis is a moth in the family Geometridae. It is found on Borneo, Peninsular Malaysia and in Singapore. The habitat consists of montane areas.

Adults are brown with strong fasciation.

The larvae have been recorded feeding on the flowers of Hevea species.

References

Moths described in 1997
pseudotibialis